Ian Murray McLachlan  (born 2 October 1936) is a former Australian politician who served as a member of the House of Representatives from 1990 to 1998, representing the Liberal Party. He was Minister for Defence in the Howard Government from 1996 to 1998. Before entering politics, he served as president of the National Farmers Federation from 1984 to 1988. He played first-class cricket as a youth.

Early life
Born in North Adelaide, McLachlan was educated at St. Peter's College, Adelaide, where he first displayed his cricketing prowess, and Jesus College at the University of Cambridge.

He played 72 matches of first-class cricket for Cambridge University and South Australia between 1956 and 1964, scoring 3743 runs at an average of 31.72, with 9 centuries while completing his bachelor and masters in Law.

Professional life
His business career includes managing director of Nangwarry Pastoral Co. Pty. Ltd., deputy chairman of SA Brewing Pty. Ltd (1983–1990), director of Elders IXL Ltd. (1980–1990) and president of the National Farmers Federation (1984–1988).  He was made an Officer of the Order of Australia (AO) in January 1989 for "service to primary industry". He was a long term president (till 2014) of the South Australian Cricket Association.

Political life 
McLachlan was the member for Barker from 1990 until 1998 when he retired. He was Federal Minister for Defence from 1996 to 1998.

There was an earlier attempt to get McLachlan into Parliament in the lead-up to the 1987 election. According to John Howard, then Opposition Leader, stated in 2014 that Liberal MP Alexander Downer had offered to stand aside from his seat of Mayo in favour of McLachlan but the offer was declined.

It was revealed in 2006 that McLachlan was present at a meeting between John Howard and Peter Costello, arranging a handover of power after one and a half terms if Howard was allowed to become opposition leader without challenge, and then won office from the Australian Labor Party (ALP). Howard later reneged on this deal, leading to controversy and public bickering between Prime Minister Howard and Treasurer Costello.
The revelation was made by McLachlan himself and Howard later said in The Howard Years documentary series that he had decided to hand over the prime ministership to Costello in 2006 but changed his mind as a result of the revelation of the deal.

References

1936 births
Living people
Liberal Party of Australia members of the Parliament of Australia
Members of the Cabinet of Australia
Members of the Australian House of Representatives for Barker
Members of the Australian House of Representatives
Australian cricketers
Cambridge University cricketers
South Australia cricketers
Commonwealth XI cricketers
Australian sportsperson-politicians
Alumni of Jesus College, Cambridge
People educated at St Peter's College, Adelaide
Defence ministers of Australia
20th-century Australian politicians
Government ministers of Australia
Cricketers from Adelaide
Sportsmen from South Australia
Politicians from Adelaide
Officers of the Order of Australia